Brinna Kelly is a United States film producer, writer, and actress.  She is known for writing and acting in The Fare and The Midnight Man.

Early life and career 
Kelly began her acting career as a child, in television dramas in Asia. She later moved to Los Angeles and graduated from UCLA's School of Theater, Film and Television.

Her writing and producing debut, The Midnight Man, was released in 2016. In 2017, she produced the horror short The Binding.  In 2018, she wrote and starred in The Fare.

External links 

21st-century Hungarian actresses
21st-century Chinese actresses
Living people
Year of birth missing (living people)
UCLA Film School alumni